Nathan Woodward (born 17 October 1989)  is a British track and field athlete, competing in the 400 metre hurdles.

Born in Solihull, he attended Water Orton Primary School and The Coleshill Secondary School. At age 11 he took up athletics and excelled in the 800 metres and in combined events, before switching to the 400 metre hurdles at age 16. After his A levels he moved to Loughborough University to study Human Biology and pursue his athletics career.

He competed at his first senior championship in 2010, finishing fourth in his semi-final at the 2010 European Athletics Championships.

He won a silver medal at the 2011 European Athletics U23 Championships, behind countryman Jack Green. Nathan was selected for the British team for the 2011 World Championships in Athletics,  in the 400m hurdles. He finished second in his heat to advance to the semi-finals, in which he finished sixth and was eliminated.

In 2012, he finished third in the UK Olympic trials, behind Dai Greene and Jack Green, who secured their places, leaving the third place to be decided at the European Championships. Rhys Williams won gold in the 400 hurdles at the 2012 European Athletics Championships, whereas Woodward finished seventh as he was just recovering from an injury. He was therefore not selected for the 2012 Olympic team despite having the A Standard.

References

External links
Official website

1989 births
Living people
Sportspeople from Solihull
English male sprinters
English male hurdlers
British male sprinters
British male hurdlers
World Athletics Championships athletes for Great Britain
British Athletics Championships winners
Alumni of Loughborough University